Tom or Thomas Emerson may refer to:

Tom Emerson (Canadian football) (born c. 1935), Canadian football player for the Edmonton Eskimos
Tom Emerson (architect) (born 1970), British architect 
Thomas I. Emerson, American attorney and professor of law
S. Thomas Emerson, also known as Tom, American serial entrepreneur, angel investor and educator